The 6th Australian Academy of Cinema and Television Arts International Awards (commonly known as the AACTA International Awards will be presented by the Australian Academy of Cinema and Television Arts (AACTA), a non-profit organisation whose aim is to identify, award, promote and celebrate Australia's greatest achievements in film and television. Awards will be handed out for the best films of 2016 regardless of the country of origin, and are the international counterpart to the awards for Australian films.

The awards will be presented on 6 January 2017 at The Avalon in Hollywood, Los Angeles with Australian actor Daniel MacPherson hosting the event. The ceremony will be broadcast on Foxtel Arts in Australia on 8 January. The nominees were announced on 13 December 2016 with Hacksaw Ridge, La La Land and Lion receiving nominations in all seven categories.

Nominees

See also
23rd Screen Actors Guild Awards
22nd Critics' Choice Awards
70th British Academy Film Awards
74th Golden Globe Awards
89th Academy Awards

References

External links
 The Official Australian Academy of Cinema and Television Arts website

AACTA International Awards
AACTA International Awards
AACTA Awards ceremonies
AACTA International
2017 in American cinema